Mykola Buy (born 22 May 1996 in Lviv Oblast, Ukraine) is a professional Ukrainian football midfielder who plays for Epitsentr Dunaivtsi.

Career
Buy is a product of the FC Lviv youth sportive school system.

He played in many different Lviv Oblast amateur teams in his early years, and later signed a contract with the Ukrainian First League club "FC Illichivets" in July 2016.

He made his debut for FC Illichivets in a game against FC Obolon-Brovar Kyiv on 26 August 2016 in the Ukrainian First League.

Honours

Individual
Ukrainian Cup Top scorer (shared): 2020–21

References

External links
Profile at FFU Official Site (Ukr)

1996 births
Living people
Ukrainian footballers
FC Rochyn Sosnivka players
FC Mariupol players
FC Illichivets-2 Mariupol players
FC Rukh Lviv players
FC Ahrobiznes Volochysk players
FC Epitsentr Dunaivtsi players
Association football midfielders
Ukrainian First League players
Sportspeople from Lviv Oblast